is an original Japanese anime television series produced by Cygames and P.A. Works. It is directed by Sōichi Masui and written by Yoshihiro Hiki, and features character designs by Manabu Nii and music by Yoshihiro Ike. It aired from October to December 2022 on Tokyo MX, BS11, KBS Kyoto, and SUN. Sentai Filmworks licensed the series, and is available for streaming on HIDIVE. In Europe, Crunchyroll licensed this series.

Plot
In Akihabara in 1999, a 17-year-old girl named Nagomi Wahira begins her new job working at a pig-themed maid café, trying to follow her dream of being a cheerful and hardworking maid. However, Nagomi soon finds the world of maid cafés in Akihabara is a lot more cutthroat than she anticipated at first.

Characters
 
 
 A fresh-faced 17-year-old girl who moves to Akiba to become a maid café waitress after seeing a flier from the Oinky Doink Cafe. Despite her initial enthusiasm, Nagomi quickly becomes disillusioned when she gets dragged into the schemes of the café and her manager as she begins to learn the hard reality of being a maid. At the end of the series she becomes disabled after her legs are shot, but she continues working as a maid as of 2018.
 
 
 A 35-year-old woman with a stern, professional demeanor at all times, whether serving patrons at the cafe or gunning down rival maids. Despite being introduced as a rookie at the Oinky Doink Cafe, Ranko has a history in the world of the Akiba Maids stretching back over a decade. She previously spent some time in prison. She is later killed while shopping with Nagomi.
 
 
 One of the veteran maids at the Oinky Doink Cafe, with a small but dedicated following, able to read other people and turn on her charm as needed.
 
 
 A tanned gyaru and another veteran maid at the Oinky Doink Cafe.
 
 
 A new maid in Oinky Doink Cafe. Growing up in the former Soviet Union, she was forbidden to touch and play with cute things by her strict parents. She becomes a maid in Japan following the collapse of the Soviet Union but struggles to cope with life in Japan before meeting Ranko.
 
 
 The manager of the Oinky Doink Cafe. Her bad luck with money puts her in debt to the Creatureland group, and her schemes to get out of debt make things worse.
  
 
 The mascot of the Oinky Doink Cafe, despite being a panda instead of a pig. Okachimachi does support the other cafe members as needed. Their identity is later revealed to be the maid who shot Michiyo (Ranko's former employer), on the orders of Nagi.
 
 
 A maid working in the Invader Café Destron, which is owned by Oinky Donk's business rival Maidalien, which allows her to have some knowledge about the yakuza-like business of the maids. Despite this, she and Nagomi become friends and later sisters-in-law. She is later murdered for trying to undermine Maidalien's attempt to wage war against its rivals, which deeply traumatizes Nagomi.
 
 
 A hard-boiled man dressed like a stereotypical otaku who serves as the middleman for the Creatureland group and the various maid cafes in Akihabara under its umbrella. He is murdered by Nagi after the Oinky Donk Cafe wins the Lady Omoe Festival.
 
 
 The leader of Creatureland group, she is formerly a maid at Michiyo's Maid Teahouse named Uzuko and the sworn sister of Ranko. She is responsible for orchestrating the war between the maids of Akihabara.

Media

Anime

Episode list

Stage play
On December 26, 2022, a stage play adaptation was announced and will run in Tokyo through September 2023.

Notes

References

External links
  
 

Akihabara
Anime with original screenplays
Crunchyroll anime
Cygames franchises
Dark comedy anime and manga
Girls with guns anime and manga
Maids in fiction
P.A.Works
Sentai Filmworks
Television series set in 1999
Tokyo MX original programming
Yakuza in anime and manga